The IYRU Fifteen Metre class yachts are constructed to the First International rule of 1907. A total of twenty 15mR yachts were built between 1907 and 1917, the four that have survived are still actively raced.

History 
The IYRU International Rule was set up in 1907 to replace the YRA 1901 revised Linear Rating Rule. The IYRU 15mR boats would replace the YRA 52-raters and open competition to foreign nations, replacing local or national systems with a unified rating system across Europe. The rule changed several times, but the 15mR boats only raced in the first rule of 1907. The twenty boats that were built, were raced in Spain, France, Britain and Germany. The rule was proposed for competition in the 1908 Olympics but there were no entries.

1907 Rule

The 15-Metre class is a construction class, meaning that the boats are not identical but are all designed to meet specific measurements in a formula, in this case the In their heyday, Metre classes were the most important group of international yacht racing classes, and they are still actively raced around the world. "Metre" does not refer to the length of the boat, but to her rating; the length overall of 15mR boats measuring almost .

The 15mR formula used in the First International Rule from 1907 to 1920:

where
L = load waterline length in metres
B = beam in metres
G = chain girth in metres
d = difference between girth and chain in metres
S = sail area in square metres
F = freeboard in metres

Boats

References

Sources

Bibliography

Keelboats
Lists of individual sailing yachts
Development sailing classes